Massachusetts House of Representatives' 26th Middlesex district in the United States is one of 160 legislative districts included in the lower house of the Massachusetts General Court. It covers part of Middlesex County. Democrat Mike Connolly of Cambridge has represented the district since 2017.

Locales represented
The district includes the following localities:
 part of Cambridge
 part of Somerville

The current district geographic boundary overlaps with those of the Massachusetts Senate's 2nd Middlesex district and Middlesex and Suffolk district.

Former locale
The district previously covered part of Lowell, circa 1872.

Representatives
 Eliel Shumway, circa 1858 
 Robert P. Woods, circa 1858 
 Charles Babbidge, circa 1859 
 James P. Longley, circa 1859 
 David H. Clark, circa 1888 
 Charles H. Brown, circa 1920 
 James Morrison, circa 1920 
 Michael Catino, circa 1951 
 Thomas J. Doherty, circa 1951 
 C. Eugene Farnam, circa 1951 
 Edward M. Dickson, circa 1971-1974 
 Edward J. Markey, 1975-1976 
 John C. McNeil, 1977-1978 
 Mary Jane Gibson, 1979-1992 
 Anne M. Paulsen, 1993-2002 
 Timothy J. Toomey Jr., 2003-2016 
 Mike Connolly, 2017-current

See also
 List of Massachusetts House of Representatives elections
 List of Massachusetts General Courts
 List of former districts of the Massachusetts House of Representatives
 Other Middlesex County districts of the Massachusetts House of Representatives: 1st, 2nd, 3rd, 4th, 5th, 6th, 7th, 8th, 9th, 10th, 11th, 12th, 13th, 14th, 15th, 16th, 17th, 18th, 19th, 20th, 21st, 22nd, 23rd, 24th, 25th, 27th, 28th, 29th, 30th, 31st, 32nd, 33rd, 34th, 35th, 36th, 37th

Legislator portraits

References

External links
 Ballotpedia. Massachusetts House of Representatives Twenty-sixth Middlesex District
  (State House district information based on U.S. Census Bureau's American Community Survey).

House
Government of Middlesex County, Massachusetts